Microcolona limodes is a species of moth in the family Elachistidae. It is endemic to New Zealand. The larvae of this moth eat the seeds of endemic Myrsine species.

Taxonomy  

This species was described by Edward Meyrick in 1897 using material collected at Riccarton Bush in Christchurch during March. George Hudson discussed this species in his 1928 publication The Butterflies and Moths of New Zealand. The lectotype specimen is held at the Natural History Museum, London.

Description 
Meyrick described the species as follows:

Distribution 
This species is endemic to New Zealand. Other than in Canterbury, this species has also been found at Pitt Island and Northland.

Habitat and host species 
This species has been found to be present in gumland heath habitat. The larvae of this moth feed on the seeds of Myrsine australis and Myrsine salicina.

References

External links 
 Images of this moth

Moths described in 1897
Microcolona
Moths of New Zealand
Endemic fauna of New Zealand
Taxa named by Edward Meyrick
Endemic moths of New Zealand